Heshan Perera (born 12 October 1991) is a Sri Lankan cricketer. He made his first-class debut for Lankan Cricket Club in Tier B of the 2007–08 Premier Trophy on 21 March 2008.

References

External links
 

1991 births
Living people
Sri Lankan cricketers
Lankan Cricket Club cricketers
Sri Lanka Police Sports Club cricketers
Cricketers from Colombo